Radoslav Holúbek (born 28 November 1975) is a Slovak sprinter. He competed in the men's 4 × 400 metres relay at the 2000 Summer Olympics.

References

1975 births
Living people
Athletes (track and field) at the 2000 Summer Olympics
Slovak male sprinters
Slovak male hurdlers
Olympic athletes of Slovakia
Place of birth missing (living people)